Mikveh or mikvah ( mikva'ot, mikvoth, mikvot, or (Yiddish) mikves, lit., "a collection") is a bath used for the purpose of ritual immersion in Judaism to achieve ritual purity.

Most forms of ritual impurity can be purified through immersion in any natural collection of water. However, some impurities, such as a zav, require "living water", such as springs or groundwater wells. Living water has the further advantage of being able to purify even while flowing, as opposed to rainwater which must be stationary to purify. The mikveh is designed to simplify this requirement, by providing a bathing facility that remains in contact with a natural source of water.

In Orthodox Judaism, these regulations are steadfastly adhered to; consequently, the mikveh is central to an Orthodox Jewish community. Conservative Judaism also formally holds to the regulations. The existence of a mikveh is considered so important that a Jewish community is required to construct a mikveh even before building a synagogue, and must go to the extreme of selling Torah scrolls, or even a synagogue if necessary, to provide funding for its construction.

Etymology
Formed from the Semitic root ק-ו-ה (q-w-h, "collect"). In the Hebrew Bible, the word is employed in the sense of "collection", including in the phrase מקוה המים (miqwêh hammayim, "collection of water") in Gen. 1:10, Ex. 7:19, and Lev. 11:36. Ben Sira is the earliest author to use מקוה as a word for "pool" (Ecclus 43:20, 48:17) and the Mishnah is the earliest text to use it in the sense of "ritual bath".

History

Before the beginning of the first century BC, neither written sources nor archaeology gives any indication about the existence of specific installations used for ritual cleansing. Mikvoth appear at the beginning of the first century BC, and from then on, ancient mikvoth can be found throughout the land of Israel, as well as in historic communities of the Jewish diaspora.

In October 2020, a 2,000-year-old mikveh was found near Hannaton in northern Israel.

Requirements

The traditional rules regarding the construction of a mikveh are based on those specified in classical rabbinical literature. According to these rules, a mikveh must be connected to a natural spring or well of naturally occurring water, and thus can be supplied by rivers and lakes which have natural springs as their source. A cistern filled by the rainwater is also permitted to act as a mikveh's water supply so long as the water is never collected in a vessel. Similarly snow, ice and hail are allowed to act as the supply of water to a mikveh no matter how they were transferred to the mikveh. A river that dries up upon occasion cannot be used because it is presumed to be rainwater and not spring water, which cannot purify while in a flowing state. Oceans and seas for the most part have the status of natural springs.

A mikveh must, according to the classical regulations, contain enough water to cover the entire body of an average-sized person; based on a mikveh with the dimensions of 3 cubits deep, 1 cubit wide, and 1 cubit long, the necessary volume of water was estimated as being 40 seah of water. The exact volume referred to by a seah is debated, and classical rabbinical literature specifies only that it is enough to fit 144 eggs; most Orthodox Jews use the stringent ruling of the Avrohom Yeshaya Karelitz, according to which one seah is 14.3 litres, and therefore a mikveh must contain approximately 575 litres. This volume of water can later be topped up with water from any source, but if there were less than 40 seahs of water in the mikveh, then the addition of 3 or more pints of water that was at any time intentionally collected in any vessel or transferred by a human, would render the mikveh unfit for use, regardless of whether water from a natural source was then added to make up 40 seahs from a natural source; a mikveh rendered unfit for use in this way would need to be completely drained away and refilled from scratch in the prescribed way.

Although not commonly accepted, at least one American Orthodox rabbi advocated a home mikvah using tap water. As water flows through only pipes that open at both ends, the municipal and in-home plumbing would be construed as a non-vessel. So long as the pipes, hoses, and fittings are all freestanding and not held in the hand, they could be used to fill a mikvah receptacle that met all other requirements.

There are also classical requirements for the manner in which the water can be stored and transported to the pool; the water must flow naturally to the mikveh from the source, which essentially means that it must be supplied by gravity or a natural pressure gradient, and the water cannot be pumped there by hand or carried. It was also forbidden for the water to pass through any vessel which could hold water within it or is capable of becoming impure (anything made of metal); however, pipes open to the air at both ends are fine so long as there is no significant curvature). As a result, tap water could not be used as the primary water source for a mikveh, although it can be used to top the water up to a suitable level. To avoid issues with these rules in large cities, various methods are employed to establish a valid mikveh. One is that tap water is made to flow into a kosher mikveh, and through a conduit into a larger pool. A second method is to create a mikveh in a deep pool, place a floor with holes over that and then fill the upper pool with tap water. In this way, it is considered as if the person dipping is actually "in" the pool of rain water.

Most contemporary mikvoth are indoor constructions involving rainwater collected from a cistern and passed through a duct by gravity into an ordinary bathing pool; the mikveh can be heated, taking into account certain rules, often resulting in an environment not unlike a spa.

A mikveh must be built into the ground or built as an essential part of a building. Portable receptacles, such as bathtubs, whirlpools or Jacuzzis, can therefore never function as mikvehs.

Reasons for immersion in a mikveh

Halachic reasons

Traditionally, the mikveh was used by both men and women to regain ritual purity after various events, according to regulations laid down in the Torah and in classical rabbinical literature.

Cases where the Torah or rabbinic law requires full immersion include:
 one who wishes to become pure after Keri — normal emissions of semen, whether from sexual activity, or from nocturnal emission. Bathing in a mikveh due to Keri is required by the Torah in order that one should be allowed to eat terumah or a sacrifice; Ezra instituted that one should also do so in order to be allowed to recite words of Torah. The latter case is known as tevilath Ezra ("the immersion of Ezra"). In modern times it is no longer considered obligatory, but some perform it as a custom.
 one who wishes to become pure after Zav/Zavah (abnormal discharges of body fluids) or niddah (menstruation), or one who has come into contact with such people or their clothes or articles; In particular, a married woman must immerse in order to resume marital relations with her husband.
 one who wishes to become pure after Tzaraath (certain skin conditions, often referred to as "leprosy" though likely not the same as the modern medical form of leprosy)
 a Kohen who is being consecrated;
 the Kohen Gadol on Yom Kippur, after sending away the goat to Azazel, and by the man who leads away the goat;
 the Kohen who performed the Red Heifer ritual;
 one who wishes to become pure after contact with a corpse or grave, in addition to having the ashes of the Red Heifer ritual sprinkled upon them;
 one who wishes to become pure after eating meat from an animal that died naturally.
 one who is converting to Judaism, regardless of gender
 Immersion of vessels utensils acquired from a gentile and used for food
 Although the Temple Mount is treated by many Orthodox Jewish authorities as being forbidden territory, a number of groups permit access, but require immersion before ascending the Mount as a precaution.

After the destruction of the Temple, the mikveh's main uses remained as follows:
 by Jewish women to achieve ritual purity after menstruation and childbirth before they and their husbands may resume marital relations;
 by Jewish men to achieve ritual purity after ejaculation;
 as part of the traditional procedure for conversion to Judaism;
 to immerse newly acquired metal and glass utensils used in serving and eating food;
 to immerse a corpse as part of the preparation for burial (taharah).

Customs
It also became customary for Kohanim to fully immerse themselves before Jewish holidays, and the laity of many communities subsequently adopted this practice. 
Immersion in a mikveh is customary in the following circumstances:
 By a bridegroom, on the day of his wedding, according to the custom of some communities
 By a father, prior to the circumcision of his son, according to the custom of some communities
 By a kohen, prior to a service in which he will recite the priestly blessing, according to the custom of some communities
 Before Yom Kippur, according to the custom of some communities, sometimes including married women as well as men
 Before Rosh Hashana, according to the custom of some communities
 Before a Jewish holiday, according to the custom of some communities
 Weekly before Shabbat, under Hasidic and Haredi customs
 Every day, under Hasidic customs

Immersion for men is more common in Hasidic communities, and done rarely in others, like German Jewish communities, where it is generally done only before the High Holidays.

In Modern Judaism
Some Jewish funeral homes have a mikveh for immersing a body during the purification procedure (taharah) before burial.

Orthodox Judaism

Orthodox Judaism generally adheres to the classical regulations and traditions, and consequently Orthodox Jewish women are obligated to immerse in a mikveh between niddah and sexual relations with their husbands. This includes brides before their marriage, and married women after their menstruation period or childbirth. In accordance with Orthodox rules concerning modesty, men and women are required to immerse in separate mikveh facilities in separate locations, or to use the mikveh at different designated times.

Recent Orthodox writings
Rabbi Aryeh Kaplan connects the laws of impurity to the narrative in the beginning of Genesis. According to Genesis, by eating of the fruit, Adam and Eve had brought death into the world. Kaplan points out that most of the laws of impurity relate to some form of death (or in the case of Niddah the loss of a potential life). One who comes into contact with one of the forms of death must then immerse in water which is described in Genesis as flowing out of the Garden of Eden (the source of life) in order to cleanse oneself of this contact with death (and by extension of sin).

Rabbi Abraham Isaac Kook offered an additional message for mikveh: By immersing ourselves in water, "we are forced to recognize our existential estrangement from the physical universe. How long can we survive under water? The experience of submerging drives home the realization that our existence in this world is transient, and we should strive towards more lasting goals."

Conservative Judaism

In a series of responsa on the subject of Niddah in December 2006, the Committee on Jewish Law and Standards of Conservative Judaism reaffirmed a requirement that Conservative women use a mikveh monthly following the end of the niddah period following menstruation, while adopting certain leniencies including reducing the length of the nidda period. The three responsa adopted permit a range of approaches from an opinion reaffirming the traditional ritual to an opinion declaring the concept of ritual purity does not apply outside the Temple in Jerusalem, proposing a new theological basis for the ritual, adapting new terminology including renaming the observances related to menstruation from taharat hamishpacha family purity to kedushat hamishpaha [family holiness] to reflect the view that the concept of ritual purity is no longer considered applicable, and adopting certain leniencies including reducing the length of the niddah period.

Isaac Klein's A Guide to Jewish Religious Practice, a comprehensive guide frequently used within Conservative Judaism, also addresses Conservative views on other uses of a mikveh, but because it predates the 2006 opinions, it describes an approach more closely resembling the Orthodox one, and does not address the leniencies and views those opinions reflected. Rabbi Miriam Berkowitz's recent book Taking the Plunge: A Practical and Spiritual Guide to the Mikveh (Jerusalem: Schechter Institute, 2007) offers a comprehensive discussion of contemporary issues and new mikveh uses along with traditional reasons for observance, details of how to prepare and what to expect, and how the laws developed. Conservative Judaism encourages, but does not require, immersion before Jewish Holidays (including Yom Kippur), nor the immersion of utensils purchased from non-Jews. New uses are being developed throughout the liberal world for healing (after rape, incest, divorce, etc.) or celebration (milestone birthdays, anniversaries, ordination, or reading Torah for the first time).

As in Orthodox Judaism, converts to Judaism through the Conservative movement are required to immerse themselves in a mikveh. Two Jews must witness the event, at least one of which must actually see the immersion. Immersion into a mikveh has been described as a very emotional, life-changing experience similar to a graduation.

Reform and Reconstructionist Judaism

Reform and Reconstructionist Judaism do not hold the halachic requirements of mikveh the way Orthodox Judaism does. However, there are growing trends toward using mikveh for conversions, wedding preparation, and even before holidays. In the 21st century the mikveh is experiencing a revival among progressive Jews who view immersion as a way to mark transitions in their lives. "Open" mikvoth welcome Jews to consider immersion for reasons not necessarily required by Jewish law; they might immerse following a divorce or medical treatment, to find closure after an abortion, or to celebrate a life transition, among other reasons. Progressive Jews may also use the mikveh for conversion.

During pregnancy 
In some Jewish communities it is customary that at some point during the ninth month of  pregnancy one should dip in a mikveh.

Requirements during use
There is supposed to be no barrier between the person immersing and the water. The person should be wearing no clothes, jewelry, makeup, nail polish, fake nails, or grooming products on the hair or skin. For more observant Jewish women, an attendant will ensure these requirements are met. Showering or bathing and carefully checking the whole body is, therefore, part of the religious requirements before entering the water of a Mikveh for a woman.

Hair
According to rabbinical tradition, the hair counts as part of the body, and therefore water is required to touch all parts of it, meaning that braids cannot be worn during immersion. This has resulted in debate between the various ethnic groups within Judaism, about whether hair combing is necessary before immersion. The Ashkenazi community generally supports the view that hair must be combed straight so that there are no knots, but some take issue with this stance, particularly when it comes to dreadlocks. A number of rabbinical rulings argue in support of dreadlocks, on the basis that
 dreadlocks can sometimes be loose enough to become thoroughly saturated with water, particularly if the person had first showered
 combing dreadlocked hair can be painful
 although a particularly cautious individual would consider a single knotted hair as an obstruction, in most cases hair is loose enough for water to pass through it unless each hair is individually knotted

Allegorical uses of the term mikveh
The word mikveh makes use of the same root letters in Hebrew as the word for "hope" and this has served as the basis for homiletical comparison of the two concepts in both biblical and rabbinic literature. For instance, in the Book of Jeremiah, the word mikveh is used in the sense of "hope", but at the same time also associated with "living water":

In the Mishnah, following on from a discussion about Yom Kippur, immersion in a Mikveh is compared by Rabbi Akiva with the relationship between God and Israel. Akiva refers to the description of God in the Book of Jeremiah as the "Mikveh of Israel", and suggests that "just as a mikveh purifies the contaminated, so does the Holy One, blessed is he, purify Israel".

A different allegory is used by many Jews adhering to a belief in resurrection as one of the Thirteen Principles of Faith. Since "living water" in a lifeless frozen state (as ice) is still likely to again become living water (after melting), it became customary in traditional Jewish bereavement rituals to read the seventh chapter of the Mikvaot tractate in the Mishnah, following a funeral; the Mikvaot tractate covers the laws of the mikveh, and the seventh chapter starts with a discussion of substances which can be used as valid water sources for a mikveh – snow, hail, frost, ice, salt, and pourable mud.

Controversies

Use by Reform and Conservative converts
The Reform Movement’s Israel Religious Action Center sued the state on behalf of the Reform and Conservative/Masorti movements to allow members to use publicly funded mikvoth. The case, which took ten years to resolve, resulted in the Israeli Supreme Court ruling that public ritual baths must accept all prospective converts to Judaism, including converts to  Reform and Conservative Judaism. In his 2016 ruling, Supreme Court Justice Elyakim Rubinstein said barring certain converts amounts to discrimination. Until this ruling, Orthodox officials barred non-Orthodox converts from using any mikveh, claiming their traditions do not conform to Jewish law, and the people they convert are therefore not Jews. Rubinstein noted: "Once it established public mikvahs, and put them at the service of the public — including for the process of conversion — the State cannot but be even-handed in allowing their use." He also said. "The State of Israel is free to supervise the use of its mikvahs, so long as it does so in an egalitarian manner."

Intrusive questions
In 2013, the Israeli Center for Women's Justice and Kolech, an organization committed to Orthodox Jewish feminism, petitioned the Supreme Court to forbid attendants from asking intrusive questions of women at state-funded and -operated mikvot. In response, the Chief Rabbinate said it would forbid questioning of women about their marital status before immersion. The complaint had charged that the practice represented unacceptable discrimination.
In 2015, however, the ITIM Advocacy Center filed a complaint with the Israeli Supreme Court on behalf of 13 Orthodox women against the Chief Rabbinate and the Jerusalem Religious Council, insisting that women be allowed to use the mikvah "according to their personal customs and without supervision, or with their own attendant if they wish". The complaint charged that the Chief Rabbinate is ignoring directives passed in 2013 that allow women to use the mikvah facilities without being asked intrusive questions by attendants. In June 2016, the Chief Rabbinate agreed to allow women to use a mikveh without an attendant.

Transgender people 
Some transgender people have adopted the practice of mikveh immersion to mark a gender transition. However, many Orthodox authorities who control mikvaot only permit immersions that adhere with Jewish law. Therefore, other Jewish organizations strive to create mikvaot that allow for different uses, such as marking any important life transitions. Mayyim Hayyim, an organization in Newton, Massachusetts, collaborated with Keshet, one of Boston's LGBT Jewish organizations, to actively create a mikveh space that felt accessible to transgender people, including training mikveh guides on gender issues.

There is some controversy within the Jewish transgender community about the use of mikvah to mark gender transitions. Some feel uncomfortable in a space that is traditionally so highly gendered and that requires complete nudity. Others still see mikveh as a place for married women to go after their periods, and therefore a transgender female would be exempt from these requirements as she does not menstruate.

See also
 Baptism
 Bath (unit)
 Conversion to Judaism
 Ghusl – full body washing ablution in Islam
 Mikva'ot – section of the Mishnah discussing the laws pertaining to the building and maintenance of a mikveh.
 Misogi
 Niddah
 Ritual washing in Judaism
 Ritual Washing in Mandaeism
 Tamasha

References

Bibliography
 Isaac Klein, A Guide to Jewish Religious Practice, JTS Press, New York, 1992
 Kolel Menachem, Kitzur Dinei Taharah: A Digest of the Niddah Laws Following the Rulings of the Rebbes of Chabad, Kehot Publication Society, Brooklyn, New York, 2005

External links

 Mikvah.org Global Directory  
 The Mikvah, by Rivkah Slonim (Chabad.org)
 The Mikvah: A Spiritual Experience
 Pathways to the Sacred video clip with Anita Diamant
 Mikvahs / Mikveh: Immersion in the Bible
 Europe's Oldest Mikveh in Syracuse, Italy
  Purification Rituals in Mediaeval Judaism – Videos made by scientists of the German Research Foundation for DFG Science TV

Bereavement in Judaism
Jewish ritual purity law
Jewish marital law
Judaism and sexuality
Ritual purification
Water and religion
Hebrew words and phrases in Jewish law
Jewish buildings